Mellit is a district of North Darfur state, Sudan. Its population was 135,831 in 2008.

References

Districts of Sudan